The Central New York Business Journal is an American newspaper publisher serving Syracuse, New York and Central New York. It is published in print and digital and focuses on the local business dealings in the central New York region. BizEventz is a sister company of the newspaper and offers business-to-business special events such as conferences, seminars, and trade shows.

The company was founded in 1986 by Norm Poltenson. It was sold in March 2014, to his daughter Marny Nesher, who has since served as the president.

The Central New York Business Journal is not affiliated with The Business Journals, which does not have market presence in Syracuse area.

References

External links

1986 establishments in New York (state)
Newspapers published in Syracuse, New York
Newspaper companies of the United States
Privately held companies based in New York (state)